Björn Borg was the defending champion, but did not participate this year.

Mats Wilander won the title, defeating Tomáš Šmíd 7–5, 4–6, 6–4 in the final.

Seeds

  Vitas Gerulaitis (semifinals)
  Mats Wilander (champion)
  Balázs Taróczy (second round)
  Tomáš Šmíd (final)
  Heinz Günthardt (second round)
  Pavel Složil (second round)
  Marcos Hocevar (first round)
  Claudio Panatta (quarterfinals)

Draw

Finals

Top half

Bottom half

External links
 ATP main draw

1982 in Swiss sport
1982 Grand Prix (tennis)
1982 Geneva Open